Tal Danino is a synthetic biologist and assistant professor of biomedical engineering at Columbia University.

Education 

Danino graduated from the University of California, Los Angeles with Bachelor of Science degrees in physics, mathematics and chemistry. He received a Master of Science and Doctor of Philosophy in bioengineering from the University of California, San Diego, and completed postdoctoral training at the Massachusetts Institute of Technology.

Research 

Danino’s research focuses on the design and characterization of dynamic gene circuits in microbes with applications such as cancer diagnostics and therapeutics, summarized in a 2015 TED talk.

For his PhD thesis, he worked in Jeff Hasty's laboratory at UCSD, where he created synchronized oscillations in bacterial populations through synthetic biological circuits that combined positive and negative feedback with a fluorescent reporter. The resulting paper and corresponding video were published in Nature in 2010.

As a postdoctoral scientist at MIT, he worked in Sangeeta Bhatia's laboratory at the Koch Institute for Integrative Cancer Research, where he used probiotics to colonize tumors and detect their presence in urine via a color-changing molecule, resulting in a publication in Science Translational Medicine in 2015.  Here he also characterized an engineered strain of S. typhimurium for the sustained release of cancer therapeutics, which was published in Nature in 2016.

He runs the Synthetic Biological Systems Laboratory at Columbia University, focuses on treating cancer with probiotic bacteria, in addition to dynamic gene circuit design of spatiotemporal behaviors.

Artworks 

Danino creates visual art involving bacteria and cells and encompassing various themes, often exploring the relationship of humans to microorganisms. His works have gained significant attention and have been featured in the New York Times, The Atlantic, and Wired magazine.  
He has collaborated with artists such as Vik Muniz in the Colonies series, where he developed a photolithography based printing process to create intricate patterns out of both bacterial and cancer cells. Also in collaboration with Vik Muniz and created by Bernardaud was the Petri collection, a set of porcelain dinner plates depicting pathogenic bacteria.  Tal has worked with other artists such as Anicka Yi, exploring concepts of biological identity. In Microuniverse, he used artistic processes such as silk screening to display a variety of petri-dish grown bacterial colonies on different color backgrounds to show their wide range of growth morphologies, from rings to fractals.

References

Year of birth missing (living people)
Living people
21st-century American biologists
Synthetic biologists
American biomedical engineers